HKIA may refer to:

Hamid Karzai International Airport, an airport in Kabul, Afghanistan
Hong Kong Institute of Architects, a professional body for architects in Hong Kong
Hong Kong International Airport, an airport in Chek Lap Kok, New Territories, Hong Kong
 Former Hong Kong International Airport (aka. Kai Tak Airport), an airport in New Kowloon, Hong Kong, replaced by Chek Lap Kok Airport
Hosea Kutako International Airport, an airport in Windhoek, Namibia